The 2016 Mexican Grand Prix (formally known as the Formula 1 Gran Premio de México 2016) was the Formula One motor race run on 30 October 2016 at the Autódromo Hermanos Rodríguez in Mexico City, the eighteenth Mexican Grand Prix, and the sixteenth time that the race had been run as a World Championship event since the inaugural season in .

Defending race winner Nico Rosberg entered the round with a twenty-six-point lead over teammate Lewis Hamilton in the World Drivers' Championship; they were the only two drivers who could win the title at the start of the race, and both remained in contention after it. Their team, Mercedes, held a lead of two hundred and thirty-six points over Red Bull Racing in the World Constructors' Championship before the race; Red Bull were fifty-three points ahead of Scuderia Ferrari.

Report
Lewis Hamilton won the race to narrow the Championship gap between him and teammate Nico Rosberg surviving a scare at the start when he ran wide at the first corner, before there was a brief Safety Car period after Pascal Wehrlein was punted off at the same corner. Both Max Verstappen and Sebastian Vettel were stripped of third place podium finishes when penalised post-race.  Verstappen crossed the finish line in third, followed 0.99 seconds later by Vettel, himself followed 3.55 seconds later by Verstappen's teammate Daniel Ricciardo.  Before the trophy presentation, Verstappen was penalised five seconds for cutting a race corner and unfairly maintaining his narrow lead over Vettel on lap 68. While Vettel attended the podium ceremony as the revised third-place finisher, he was soon given a ten-second penalty for driving dangerously on lap 69, for moving under braking to block Ricciardo as he attempted a pass, under new rules introduced at the United States Grand Prix the previous week. This meant that Ricciardo was promoted to third which also sealed third place in the championship for him, while Verstappen was relegated from third to fourth and Vettel was moved from fourth to third to fifth once the stewards had reviewed all incidents.

Classification

Qualifying

Notes
  – Jolyon Palmer did not set a lap time in qualifying. His participation in the race was permitted at the discretion of the stewards.

Race

Notes
  – Max Verstappen, Carlos Sainz Jr. and Daniil Kvyat received five-second penalties after the race.
  – Romain Grosjean required to start from the pit lane due to car being modified whilst under Parc Ferme conditions.
  – Sebastian Vettel received a ten-second and two licence points penalty after the race.

Championship standings after the race
Bold text indicates who still had a theoretical chance of becoming World Champion.

Drivers' Championship standings

Constructors' Championship standings

 Note: Only the top five positions are included for the sets of standings.

References

External links

2016 Formula One races
2016
Grand Prix
Grand Prix